Katala (also known as The Gambler) is a 1989 Soviet crime drama directed by Sergei Bodrov and Alexander Buravsky.

Plot
In a small seaside town lives Aleksei 'The Greek' Grekov, a former  katala    a slang term in the criminal circles meaning professional gambler. He is retired and now serves as a sailor on a pleasure boat of the semi-criminal businessman named Shota. Life goes on smoothly, but suddenly a terrible event occurs. Shota, having lost a lot of money to the criminal boss named "Director", tries to hide, the boat is burned right in the port, and Anna, Shota's girlfriend, is taken hostage by the bandits. Despite various efforts Shota falls into the hands of the criminals and they brutally kill him, but The Greek helps Anna and her young daughter escape to Moscow. Aleksei understands that while the Director does not receive all the debts of late Shota, he will go after Anna. And so The Greek who is in love with Anna decides to return to his former "craft" in order to "earn" money with a card game in order to save Anna.

In Moscow, The Greek meets his longtime acquaintance, a criminal named  Crucian, and soon they begin to win money playing cards against underground businessmen, bandits and simply gullible citizens. The amount of money accumulated by Aleksei is growing, but The Greek clearly understands that only by obtaining a huge jackpot he can finish once and for all this sordid matter. Aleksei undertakes a suicidal risk. He secretly buys special lenses that allow him to see what cards others have and challenges the Director himself to a one-on-one match. The  big game  begins and the Director loses large sums to The Greek. Lola, the criminal boss's assistant, draws attention to a certain oddity: during the game Aleksei goes to the toilet every two hours allegedly to  freshen up. In reality he occasionally has to remove his  miracle-lenses because they place a terrible strain on the eyes and can lead to loss of vision. The bandits uncover the Greek's ploy and severely punish Aleksei by turning him into a mutilated half-blind invalid.

Returning to his hometown, The Greek begins to work again in the port. After meeting with Anna, he receives terrible news. It turns out that after the death of Shota, Anna hid all his money, deceiving both the bandits and Aleksei. Shaken by Anna's treachery, The Greek bids farewell to her forever. Soon Aleksei is summoned to the police, he gives evidence against the Director, and the bloody revenge of the bandits does not delay itself.

Cast
 Valery Garkalin as Aleksei Grekov    (voice by Aleksei Zharkov)
 Sergey Gazarov as Shota, businessman
 Yelena Safonova as Anna, Shota's girlfriend
 Viktor Pavlov as Crucian 
 Lyudmila Gavrilova as Crucian's concubine
 Nodar Mgaloblishvili as Director, mafia boss (voice by Vladimir Soshalsky)
 Luiza Mosendz as Lola, Director's helper
 Igor Fokin as Phoma, Director's helper
 Renat Davletyarov as criminal
 Yuri Slobodenyuk as criminal
 Sergey Stepanchenko as Lola's lover, police officer
 Vitaly Leonov as Anna's father
 Kristina Shcherbakova as Lisa, Anna's daughter
 Larisa Kuznetsova as prostitute in the port
 Alexander Barinov as young gambler
 Vadim Aleksandrov as lost man
 Alex Papacristu as uncle Christos

Production 
The filming took place in Moscow, as well as in the Adjarian Autonomous Soviet Socialist Republic: in Batumi, Chakvi and Kobuleti.

References

External links

 ''Katala'' on KinoPoisk 

1989 films
1989 crime drama films
Russian crime drama films
1980s Russian-language films
Films about gambling
Mosfilm films
Soviet crime drama films
Films directed by Sergei Bodrov
Films about card games